The Street is a 1958 West German crime drama film directed by Hermann Kugelstadt and starring Martha Wallner, Heinz Drache and Marina Petrova.

The film's sets were designed by the art director Felix Smetana. It was shot at studios in Vienna.

Synopsis
An engineer returns from Africa to discover that his former girlfriend has fallen under the control of a drug dealer and pimp.

Cast
 Martha Wallner as Andrea
 Heinz Drache as Bob Schneider
 Marina Petrova as Marie
 Rolf Kutschera as Korbanke
 Edith Elmay as Karin
 Horst Beck as Paulsen
 Wolfgang Jansen as Max
 Raoul Retzer
 Guido Wieland as Manulescu
 Thomas Hörbiger
 Brigitte Antonius as Erna

References

Bibliography 
 Bertil Wredlund & Rolf Lindfors. Långfilm i Sverige: 1950–1959. Proprius, 1979.

External links 
 

1958 films
West German films
German crime drama films
1958 crime drama films
1950s German-language films
Films directed by Hermann Kugelstadt
Films about prostitution in Germany
Films about drugs
1950s German films